The Five: The Untold Lives of the Women Killed by Jack the Ripper is a book by British historian Hallie Rubenhold, published by Doubleday in 2019. The book examines the lives of the "canonical five", the five women largely believed to have been killed by Jack the Ripper in the Whitechapel murders. Rubenhold claims that only two of the five women, Mary Jane Kelly and Elizabeth Stride, were prostitutes.  In some cases, Rubenhold claims the women may have been targeted by the Ripper just because they were sleeping rough.

Critical reception
Overall, the book was received positively. Frances Wilson of The Guardian called the book "important" and praised its illumination of the lives of the women, as well as challenging long-held assumptions. Joanna Scutts of The Washington Post said that by "restoring 'the five' to humanity and dignity, Rubenhold's book becomes a passionate indictment of the true-crime genre, with its fixation on the minds of murderers and its shallow, glancing sympathy for the dead."

Wendy Smith, also writing for The Washington Post,  described the book as "a blistering counter-narrative to the 'male, authoritarian, and middle class' legend of a demonic superman preying on prostitutes". Smith further decisively notes that, "[Rubenhold] has a point about the legions of books that speculate endlessly about Jack the Ripper’s identity while displaying scant interest in the five human beings he viciously dispatched. Her riveting work, both compassionate group portrait, and stinging social history, finally gives them their due." Kirkus Reviews argues that, "Rubenhold urges us to see the victims as just that and not as the 'fallen women' of the received record." Her book strays from the common gory re-tellings of Jack the Ripper's femicides and instead adopts "a compassionate but unsentimental style" when describing the lives of the victims, wrote Jad Adams for Literary Review: "This is because she wants to look not at how they died but at how they lived."

Awards
The Five was shortlisted for the Wolfson History Prize in 2020 and won the 2019 Baillie Gifford Prize valued at £50,000.

References 

English-language books
Non-fiction books about Jack the Ripper
2019 non-fiction books
Gender studies books
Non-fiction books about British prostitution
Doubleday (publisher) books